Lady Love may refer to:

 Lady Love (LeToya album)
 "Lady Love" (song), a song by Lou Rawls
 "Lady Love", a song by the band Rize, used as the opening theme to the show Shion no Ō
 Lady Love (manga), a manga by Hiromu Ono
 Lady Love (Sheena Crawford), a faith-based motivator, speaker, and author
 "Lady Love", a song by the short-lived band Brunette

See also
 Love Lady, Tennessee, U.S.
 "The Lady I Love", a song by Tír na nÓg